It's All About the Stragglers is the only studio album by the English garage duo Artful Dodger. It was released on 20 November 2000 by London Records. The album contains eight different vocalists, including Craig David.

Production
The album was recorded on a small budget in a room next to a Southampton radio station.

Critical reception
The A.V. Club wrote: "Artful Dodger has always represented the lighter side of two-step, but without other artists' tracks to counter its airy levity, It's All About The Stragglers is a middling effort that makes for a less-than-thrilling introduction to an otherwise thrilling genre." Exclaim! thought that "Craig David effortlessly commands the pulsing groove of 'Whatcha Gonna Do'." Billboard called It's All About the Stragglers an "R&B-conscious, club-rooted, classically arranged album." The Chicago Tribune opined that "chances are that teens will be befuddled by the studio geekery and dance experts will scoff at its conscious fluffiness, but tunes like 'Think about Me' are an apt reminder that not all contemporary pop has to be a guilty pleasure to be fun."

Track listing
 "Think About Me"  – 4:35
 "Re-Rewind" (Radio Edit)  – 4:02
 "Outrageous"  – 4:14
 "Please Don't Turn Me On" (Radio Edit)  – 3:43
 "TwentyFourSeven"  – 3:48
 "Something"  – 4:18
 "Movin' Too Fast"  – 3:54
 "R U Ready"  – 4:39
 "I Can't Give It Up"  – 4:03
 "Woman Trouble" (Radio Edit)  – 4:00
 "What You Gonna Do?"  – 4:00
 "It Ain't Enough" (Radio Edit)  – 3:41
 "We Should Get Together"  – 4:06
 "Think About Me" (Artful Dodger 3 Step Mix) – 5:29
 "Please Don't Turn Me On" (Artful Dodger UK Garage Remix) – 5:44

Charts

Weekly charts

Year-end charts

References

2000 debut albums
Artful Dodger (duo) albums